The 1941 Gonzaga Bulldogs football team was an American football team that represented Gonzaga University during the 1941 college football season. They played their home games on campus at Gonzaga Stadium in Spokane, Washington. In their third year under head coach Puggy Hunton, the Bulldogs compiled a 3–7 record and were outscored by their opponents by a total of 201 to 65.

The season ended with a blowout home loss to Washington State on November 22, two weeks before the Attack on Pearl Harbor.  university president Father Leo J. Robinson announced that Gonzaga was suspending its intercollegiate football program for the duration of World War II. Robinson stated the loss of numerous football players and prospect to military service made further competition impossible. The program had been in financial difficulty, and varsity football was not resumed after the war.

Schedule

F  ^

References

Gonzaga
Gonzaga Bulldogs football seasons
Gonzaga Bulldogs football